Radio Lumbini (Nepali:रेडियो लुम्बिनी) is a Nepalese radio station. It started broadcasting on 10 February 2000 and is locally financed. It is known for being the first co-operative radio in South Asia and the first rural radio station in Nepal. It transmits on FM 96.8 MHz. Radio Lumbini transmits for eighteen hours a day, and produces programmes related to social, cultural and environmental awareness. The base station is located near Manigram town in Lumbini Province.

See also
List of FM radio stations in Nepal

References

Radio stations in Nepal
Radio stations established in 2000
2000 establishments in Nepal